Profundiconus tarava is a species of sea snail, a marine gastropod mollusk, in the family Conidae, the cone snails and their allies.

Distribution
This marine species occurs off the Tarava Seamounts in the Southern Pacific Ocean.

References

 Rabiller M. & Richard G. (2014). Conus (Gastropoda, Conidae) from offshore French Polynesia: Description of dredging from TARASOC expedition, with new records and new species. Xenophora Taxonomy. 5: 25-49.
 Monnier E., Limpalaër L., Robin A. & Roux C. (2018). A taxonomic iconography of living Conidae. Harxheim: ConchBooks. 2 vols. 1205 pp.

External links
  enorio M. (2016). The genus Profundiconus: Cone snails from the deep sea. 4th International Cone Meeting – Brussels, 2016

Conidae